Peptidyl-dipeptidase B (dipeptidyl carboxyhydrolase, atriopeptin convertase, atrial di-(tri)peptidyl carboxyhydrolase, peptidyldipeptidase B, atrial dipeptidyl carboxyhydrolase, atrial peptide convertase) is an enzyme. It catalyses the following chemical reaction

 Release of a C-terminal dipeptide or exceptionally a tripeptide

This membrane-bound, zinc metallopeptidase is located in mammalian atrial myocytes.

References

External links 
 

EC 3.4.15